California Coast Credit Union (also known as Cal Coast) is the longest-serving credit union in San Diego County, headquartered in San Diego, California. As of Q3 of 2020, it had more than $3.0 billion in assets, over 192,000 members, 26 branch locations and 540 employees

History
California Coast is a not-for-profit financial institution that was founded by a group of educators in 1929. Its founding members included employees of Solar Aircraft, AT&T and San Diego Gas & Electric. Today, California Coast serves residents who work or live in San Diego or Riverside counties.

It is part of the CO-OP interbank network, with access to over 30,000  ATMs in the U.S. and Canada. Through that Network, the firm also offers CO-OP Shared Branches, which gives members access to more than 5,400 nationwide branch locations.

Cal Coast Open Air Amphitheater
On January 1, 2014, the firm purchased the naming rights to San Diego State University’s on-campus amphitheater which will now be called Cal Coast Credit Union Open Air Theater. Formerly called the Greek Bowl and the Open Air Theatre, the amphitheater opened in 1941 and is one of San Diego's longest running outdoor venues.   Currently, it serves mainly as a venue for live music and comedy acts.

References

Credit unions based in California
Companies based in San Diego
Companies based in Riverside, California
1924 establishments in California
Organizations based in San Diego
Banks established in 1924
Amphitheaters in California